The 2019 Lewes District Council election was held on 2 May 2019 to elect members of Lewes District Council in England. It took place on the same day as other district council elections in the United Kingdom.

Before the 2019 election, the Council was composed of 20 Conservatives, nine Liberal Democrats, three Greens and nine Independents. To take control of the council, 21 councillors out of 41 would be needed. Although the council remained under no overall control, the Conservatives remained the largest party with 19 councillors. The Green Party won the popular vote.

Council composition
After the previous election the composition of the council was:

Prior to the election the composition of the council was:

After the election the composition of the council was:

Following the elections, a coalition between the Greens, Lib Dems, Labour and two Independent councillors took charge, ending eight years of Conservative administration.   Zoe Nicholson, leader of the Greens, became the leader of the council while James MacCleary, leader of the Lib Dems, became the deputy leader.

Summary

Election result

|-

Ward results
Sitting councillors are marked with an asterisk (*).

Chailey, Barcome & Hamsey

Ditchling & Westmeston

East Saltdean & Telscome Cliffs

Kingston

Lewes Bridge

Lewes Castle

Lewes Priory

Newhaven North

Newhaven South

Newick

Ouse Valley & Ringmer

Peacehaven East

Peacehaven North

Peacehaven West

Plumpton, Streat, East Chiltington & St John (Without)

Seaford Central

Seaford East

Seaford North

Seaford South

Seaford West

Wivelsfield

By-elections

Seaford East

Seaford West

Peacehaven West

References

2019 English local elections
May 2019 events in the United Kingdom
2019
2010s in East Sussex